Glenamoy is a village on the R314 road in the parish of Kilcommon, Erris in the northern part of County Mayo in Ireland.

Topography 
Glenamoy is a general term for the following townlands:
 Bellagelly North (Béal a Ghoile meaning "mouth of the stomach")
 Bellagelly south (Béal a Ghoile meaning "mouth of the stomach")
 Baralty (Barr Altaigh meaning "hills/cliffs/anything high")
 Bunalty (Bun Altaigh meaning "base of the hills/cliffs")
 Gortleatilla (Gort Liatuile meaning "field of the little grey stream")
 Srahnaplaia (Srath na Pláighe meaning "holm of the plague")
 Pollboy (Poll Buí meaning "yellow hole")
 Lenarevagh (An Léana Riabhach meaning "grey meadows")
 Barrooskey (Barr Rúscaigh meaning "moory or marsh land")

The townlands of Glenamoy make up the inland portion of Kilcommon Parish which is, in the main, a coastal area. Two rivers flow through this townland conglomerate. They rise in Glencalry (Belderrig) townland.

The Owenmore River flows via Carrowmore Lake into Blacksod Bay where a tributary of it known as the Munhin River connects the area with the great Ulster Cycle saga of Táin Bó Flidhais, the Glenamoy River into Sruwaddacon estuary and Broadhaven Bay. Lace schools were one of the more common industries in the area in the past. There were several shooting lodges in this area where the landlords held shooting parties for the gentry in the 19th century. The habitations in Glenamoy are spread out across a wide area today unlike other habitations in the parish which tend to be clustered, a remnant of the Rundale system of agriculture which was commonplace here for many years.

Glenamoy Bog Complex 

Glenamoy Bog Complex is a large site situated in the north-west of Erris, incorporating both inland and coastal regions. The climate is wet and oceanic and there are frequent strong winds across the area which is largely treeless and relatively exposed. The bog complex area is drained by four main river systems - the Glenamoy, the Muingnabo, the Belderg and the Glenglassra rivers.  Extreme oceanic blanket bog dominates the site in its inland areas.

The coastal habitats of Glenamoy bog complex are extensive and varied. Sea cliffs dominate the coastline reaching a height of 253 metres at Benwee Head. There are many steeply sided islands off the coastline which are mainly used a summer grazing for livestock if the area of machair on them is large enough.

Sport 
Former Mayo goalkeeper Gabriel Irwin hails from Glenamoy.

There is a football club in Glenamoy which was established in 1978.

References

Towns and villages in County Mayo
Erris